The National Professional Basketball League, often abbreviated to the NPBL, was an American men's professional basketball minor league featuring teams from the East Coast of the United States which played for two seasons.

A few of the teams in the NPBL left to join the Eastern Basketball Alliance (EBA). The planned 2009 season was never actually played. Initially the league's plan was to move the season to the fall and winter during the more traditional basketball season. The league never made any official announcement as to the cessation of its operations, but never resumed play.

Some NPBL rules
 Twenty second shot clock
 Only one time out per quarter and no carry overs
 Twelve player maximum roster
 Only two players were "All-Star" players per team
 Only two players could be designated as captains
 Mandatory three officials per game
 Seven second half court violation
 Two mandatory media time outs (one per half)

League champions by season
 2007 – Hudson Valley Hawks
 2008 – Elmira Bulldogs

NPBL Clubs

External links
 Archive of press releases on USBasket.com

Defunct professional sports leagues in the United States
Basketball leagues in the United States